Infinity Records was a short-lived subsidiary of MCA Records established in New York City in 1978.  The label was conceived by MCA president Sidney Sheinberg as a way for the Los Angeles-based entertainment conglomerate to improve its presence on the East Coast.  Ron Alexenberg, who had previously been the head of the Epic Records division of CBS Records (now part of Sony Music Entertainment) was hired as CEO.

The biggest hit the Infinity label had was "Escape" by Rupert Holmes, which was number 1 at the end of 1979.  Other acts that had chart entries on Infinity included Hot Chocolate, Dobie Gray, New England, Orleans, Orsa Lia and Spyro Gyra.  Under the distribution of MCA, the Infinity Records label released titles in the US, Canada, the UK, Japan and parts of Europe.

Infinity spent lavishly but failed to earn a profit.  In addition to developing new talent, Infinity also paid substantial sums to acquire established artists.  Most of the established artists were unable to duplicate their previous success.

In October 1979, Infinity released Pope John Paul II Sings at the Festival of Sacrosong, an album of speeches and songs sung by Pope John Paul II in his native Polish.  Due to the tremendous popularity of the new Pope, Infinity thought the record would be a major hit.  The company paid a substantial fee (which went to charity) to the Catholic Church to obtain exclusive rights to the recording.  The album briefly peaked at #126 on the Billboard 200 albums chart; however, it received poor reviews and was quickly seen as a colossal failure.  Most of the one million advance copies of the John Paul II album were returned unsold to the label, producing a huge financial loss.  MCA pulled the plug on Infinity Records in November 1979, and the Infinity catalog was immediately absorbed by the parent company. Rupert Holmes and Spyro Gyra were the only Infinity acts to be retained by MCA, and most of the label's catalog went out of print.

The collapse of Infinity also coincided with rising costs of manufacturing for vinyl LP records and a huge sales slump for the music industry.  Infinity has since become known as one of the most expensive failures in the history of the record business.

There are at least two other smaller record labels that also have used the name Infinity Records.  One of these other labels was a subsidiary of Festival Records, which for many years was Australia's leading independent record company, but is now also defunct.  Other companies with the Infinity Records name do not have an affiliation with MCA.

Partial list of Infinity Records recording artists 
 Solomon Burke
 Dixon House Band
 New England
 Robert A. Johnson credited as "Robert Johnson" (a Memphis based Roots rock guitarist, not the famous Blues musician)
 The Kats (signed to the label but had no recordings issued)
 Orsa Lia
 Racey
 TKO
 Screams (band)
 Hot Chocolate
Artists associated with other labels named Infinity Records that are not connected with MCA include:

 Richard Batchens
 The Texans (Johnny Burnette and Dorsey Brunette)
 Donald Dempsey
 Giambattista Fedrici

References

External links
 Time Magazine article on the John Paul II album

American record labels
Record labels established in 1978
Record labels disestablished in 1979
MCA Records